Robert Crawfurd Antrobus (21 March 1830 – 12 February 1911) was an English businessman, politician and first-class cricketer. He was born in London and died in Westminster.

Antrobus was the third son of Sir Edmund Antrobus, 2nd Baronet and Anne Lindsay.

He was a prominent businessman in the City of London and held directorships in the Economic Life Assurance Company, the Bibi-Eybat Petroleum Company, the Schibaieff Petroleum Company and the Thames and Mersey Marine Insurance Company.

Antrobus made two first-class cricket appearances, sixteen years apart from each other. His first appearance came at the age of just 20 years old for Gentlemen of England, in 1850, batting in the tailend against Gentlemen of Kent. Antrobus hit his first-class best score of 12 in his debut innings, and 3* in the second innings of his debut. Moving slightly further up the order for his second and final first-class match, he played for I Zingari, against a team which included, amongst others, EM and WG Grace.

He married Emily Blackburne in 1873, with whom he had three children; Sybil Mary, Sir Phillip Humphrey, 6th Baronet, and Margaret Freda Evelyn.

In 1889 he was elected unopposed to the London County Council to represent St George Hanover Square. He was re-elected in 1892 and 1895. In 1898 he became an alderman, remaining on the council until 1904. He also held the position of Justice of the Peace in both London and Middlesex.

References

1830 births
1911 deaths
English cricketers
I Zingari cricketers
People educated at Eton College
Members of London County Council
Conservative Party (UK) politicians
British sportsperson-politicians
Gentlemen of England cricketers